Ki Hong Lee (born September 30, 1986) is an American actor. He is best known for his roles as Minho in the Maze Runner film series and Dong Nguyen in the Netflix sitcom Unbreakable Kimmy Schmidt.

Early life and education
Lee was born in Seoul, South Korea, on September 30, 1986. When he was six years old, his parents moved the family to Auckland, New Zealand. When he was eight, his family moved to Los Angeles, California.

Lee studied psychology at the University of California, Berkeley from 2004 to 2008. In college, Lee was part of a college chapter of Liberty in North Korea (LiNK) and interned at their headquarters. He was also an elected Associated Students of the University of California Senator from 2005 to 2006, under the Student Action party. He ran for re-election for the 2006 to 2007 year under "The Mario Party" as 'Ki Hong "Donkey Kong " Lee' but failed to garner the necessary votes for the position.

Lee began acting in middle school, doing skits at church retreats. He initially wanted to become a teacher but was inspired to pursue acting after watching Aaron Yoo in the film Disturbia (2007) while in college. After college, he worked at his parents' sundubu jjigae restaurant, Tofu Village, in Little Tokyo while pursuing acting.

Career
Since 2010, Lee has guest starred in many different TV shows such as Victorious, The Secret Life of the American Teenager, New Girl, and Modern Family before landing a main role in ABC Family's The Nine Lives of Chloe King.

Lee made his stage debut in Wrinkles, presented by East West Players and directed by Jeff Liu. It opened on February 16, 2011 and closed on March 13, 2011 at the David Henry Hwang Theater at the Union Center for the Arts in Downtown Los Angeles.

Since 2012, Lee has collaborated with Wong Fu Productions (WFP) featuring in more than five short videos including the Away We Happened mini-series. On June 26, 2014, it was announced that Lee was cast in WFP's first feature film Everything Before Us, which focuses on "two couples at different stages of their relationships, set in a world where "all relationship activity is documented and monitored by the Department of Emotional Integrity (DEI)" and is assigned a number like a credit score." The film also featured The Tomorrow Peoples Aaron Yoo and Veep's Randall Park.

In 2013, Lee made his feature-length film debut in the YouTube, two-part film adaptation of Yellowface, from playwright David Henry Hwang. It was published by the Asian American-centric YOMYOMF network .

On April 18, 2013, director Wes Ball announced via Twitter that Lee had been cast in the film adaptation of the young-adult dystopian science fiction novel, The Maze Runner, as Minho, the keeper of the Runners in charge of navigating and mapping out the Maze. This was Lee's feature film debut. He reprised the role in the sequel, Maze Runner: The Scorch Trials, which was released on September 18, 2015, and the final film in the franchise, Maze Runner: The Death Cure, which was released on January 26, 2018.

In fall 2017, he played the lead in Julia Cho's play, Office Hour, alongside actress Sue Jean Kim in the New York premiere of the production at the Public Theater.

Personal life 
Ki Hong Lee married his childhood friend Hayoung Choi on March 7, 2015. Their daughter was born in late 2016.  Choi played Lee's character's new girlfriend in the 2013 short film She Has a Boyfriend, by Wong Fu Productions.

Filmography

Film

Short film

Television

Stage

Video games

References

External links

1986 births
American male actors of Korean descent
American male film actors
American male television actors
American male voice actors
South Korean emigrants to the United States
South Korean emigrants to New Zealand
Male actors from Los Angeles
Male actors from Seoul
People from Auckland
University of California, Berkeley alumni
Living people
21st-century American male actors